Mad Men is an American period drama television series created by Matthew Weiner and broadcast on the cable network AMC. The series premiered on July 19, 2007, and concluded on May 17, 2015, after seven seasons and 92 episodes. The show is set primarily in the 1960s and is centered on the private and professional life of Don Draper (Jon Hamm), an enigmatic advertising executive on Madison Avenue.

Series overview

Episodes

Season 1 (2007)

Season 2 (2008)

Season 3 (2009)

Season 4 (2010)

Season 5 (2012)

Season 6 (2013)

Season 7 (2014–15)

Ratings

References

External links
 
 

 
Lists of American drama television series episodes